Bayram is a rural locality (a selo) in Karlanyurtovsky Selsoviet, Khasavyurtovsky District, Republic of Dagestan, Russia. The population was 446 as of 2010. There are 14 streets.

Geography 
Bayram is located 8 km east of Khasavyurt (the district's administrative centre) by road. Petrakovskoye is the nearest rural locality.

References 

Rural localities in Khasavyurtovsky District